The apostrophe in the Ukrainian language is used before the letters я, ю, є, ї, when they denote the combination of the consonant // with the vowels //, //, //, // after б, п, в, м, ф, р and any solid consonant ending in a prefix or the first part of a compound word.

General rules 
The apostrophe is placed before я, ю, є, ї:

 After the letters denoting the labial solid consonant sounds б, п, в, м, ф, if they are not preceded by another consonant (except р), which would belong to the root: б’ю, п’ять, п’є, в’я́зи, солов’ї́, м’я́со, рум’я́ний, (на) ті́м’ї, жира́ф’ячий, мереф’я́нський; П’я́ста, В’ячесла́в, Дем’ян, Максим’ю́к, Стеф’ю́к. If the consonant in front of the labial belongs to the prefix, then the apostrophe is also placed: зв’язо́к, зв’яли́ти, підв’яза́ти, обм'я́клий, розм’я́кнути, сп’яні́ти.
 After a solid р at the end of the composition: бур’я́н, міжгі́р’я, пі́р’я, ма́тір’ю, кур’є́р, (на) подві́р’ї; Валер’я́н, Мар’я́н, Мар’я́на.
 After к in the word Лук’я́н and its derivatives: Лук’я́ненко, Лук’яню́к, Лук’яне́ць.
 After prefixes and the first part of compound words ending in a solid consonant: без’я́дерний, без’язи́кий, від’ї́зд, з’є́днаний, з’ї́хати, з’яви́тися, напів’європе́йський, об’є́м, під’ї́хати, під’ю́дити, роз’ю́шити, пан’європе́йський; дит’я́сла, камер’ю́нкер, Мін’ю́ст.

The apostrophe is not placed:

 We do not write an apostrophe when there is another letter (except p) in front of the letter to denote the lip sound, which belongs to the root (base): дзвя́кнути, духмя́ний, ма́впячий, 8 медвя́ний, морквя́ний, різдвя́ний, свя́то, тьмя́ний, цвях; but: арф’я́р, ве́рб’я, торф’яни́й, черв’я́к.
 We do not write an apostrophe when ря, рю, рє mean a combination of soft р with the following а, у, е: буря́к, бу́ряний, гаря́чий, кря́кати, крюк, рю́мсати, поряту́нок, ряби́й, рясни́й.
 After prefixes with a final consonant before the following і, е, а, о, у, we do not write the apostrophe: безіме́нний, зініціюва́ти, зеконо́мити, загітува́ти, зорієнтува́ти, зумі́ти.

 We write an apostrophe in words of foreign origin and derivatives before я, ю, є, ї, which denote the combination of the sound // with the following vowel:

 After consonants б, п, в, м, ф, г, к, х, ж, ч, ш, р: б’єф, комп’ю́тер, п’єдеста́л, інтерв’ю́, прем’є́р, кар’є́ра; П’ємо́нт, П’яче́нца, Рив’є́ра, Ак’я́б, Іх’я́мас, Ях’я́; Барб’є́, Б’ю́кенен, Донаг’ю, Женев’є́ва, Ф’є́золе, Монтеск’є́, Руж’є́, Фур’є;
 After the final consonant in the prefixes: ад'ютант, кон'юнктивіт, кон'юнктура, ін'єкція, диз’ю́нкція.

 The apostrophe is not spelled:

 In front of the digraph йo: курйо́з, серйо́зний;
 When я, ю denote the softening of the previous consonant before a, y: бязь, бюдже́т, бюро́, кюве́т, пюпі́тр, резюмé, мюри́д, фюзеля́ж, рюкза́к, рюш, Барбю́с, Бюффо́н, Вю́ртембергґ, Мю́ллер, Гюґо́, Рюдберґ.

Apostrophe in surnames 
The apostrophe is written after the labial, velar and р before я, ю, є, ї: Аляб'єв, Ареф'єв, Водоп'янов, В'яльцева, Григор'єв, Захар'їн, Луб'янцев, Лук'янов, Пом'яловський, Прокоф'єв, Юр'єв; before йо the apostrophe is not written: Воробйов, Соловйов.

Note. When я, ю mean the combination of a softened consonant a, y, the apostrophe before them is not written: Бядуля, Пясецький, Рюмін.

The abbreviated particle "d" and the Irish particle "o" are written with proper names through an apostrophe: Д'Аламбер, Д'Артаньян, Д'Обіньє; О'Генрі, О'Кейсі, О'Коннейль.

Apostrophe in geographical names 
The apostrophe is written in geographical names after labial (м, п, б, ф, в), velar (г, ґ, к, х) and р, as well as after prefixes ending in a consonant, before я, ю, є, ї: В'язники, Скóп’є, Прокоп'євськ, П'ятигорськ, Ак'яр, Амудар'я, Гур'єв; before йо the apostrophe is not written: Муравйово.

Note. When я, ю mean the combination of a softened consonant with // and //, the apostrophe before them is not written: Вязьма, Кяхта, Крюково, Рязань.

See also 

 Rules for using the soft sign in the Ukrainian language
Rule of nine in the Ukrainian language
Rules for the transmission of sounds /i/, /ɪ/, /j/ in proper names of foreign origin in the Ukrainian language

Sources 

 Ukrainian orthography of 2019

 Apostrophe // Ukrainian orthography. — К.: Scientific thought, 2012. — P. 9, P. 123.
 Handbook of Ukrainian language — Orthography

Ukrainian language
Ukrainian orthography